Texas Presbyterian College, also known as Texas Presbyterian College for Girls was a women's college as well as high school in Milford, Texas.

The first president was Henry Clay Evans. The Cumberland Presbyterian Church made donations to the institution but it was not until an aggressive fund-raising campaign to establish an endowment was held in 1917 that TPC was stable financially.

In 1911 the high school was separated into a separate academy and in 1917 the college was reorganized into a fully accredited college. In 1929 TPC closed and merged with Austin College, another Presbyterian school.

Academically, two years of Bible study were required of all students. Over 4,000 students attended the school during its existence.

Sources
Handbook of Texas online article

Educational institutions established in 1902
Defunct private universities and colleges in Texas
1929 disestablishments in Texas
1902 establishments in Texas
Educational institutions disestablished in 1929